Ali al-Jabarti (d. 1492) was a 15th-century Somali scholar and politician in the Mamluk Empire.

References

Somalian Sunni Muslim scholars of Islam
Al-Azhar University
1492 deaths